Homonationalism is often seen as the favorable association between a nationalist ideology and LGBT people or their rights, but is further described as a systematic oppression of queer, racialized, and sexualized groups in an attempt to support neoliberal structures and ideals. The term was originally proposed by the researcher in gender studies Jasbir K. Puar in 2007 to refer  to the processes by which neoliberal and capitalist power structures line up with the claims of the LGBT community in order to justify racist, xenophobic and aporophobic positions, especially against Muslims, basing them on prejudices that immigrants are homophobic and that Western society is egalitarian. Thus, sexual diversity and LGBT rights are used to sustain political stances against immigration, becoming increasingly common among far-right parties. In Terrorist Assemblages, Puar describes homonationalism as a "form of sexual exceptionalism [dependent on the] segregation and disqualification of racial and sexual others" from the dominant image of a particular society, most often discussed within an American framework.

The concept of homonationalism was created to describe and critique the nationalization of queer movements and growing anti-immigrant stances, while ignoring homophobia still propagated in Western society. Queer equality within a Western homonationalist framework is showcased as inclusion in heteronormative practices, namely legal marriage. Social equality claimed by Western society is contrasted with countries that either criminalize homosexuality or do not legally or formally recognize same-sex marriages; lack of queer equality is often associated with Muslim nations. Puar argues in her 2013 article, "Rethinking Homonationalism", that the concept should not be seen solely as a description of "bad politics" or a political accusation, but that it is instead a structure of modernity and has latched onto Western societal constructions in order to support the dominant power structures.

Bruno Perreau has criticized the premises of Puar's argument. While agreeing with her critique of nationalist claims among some LGBT groups, he argues that Puar idealizes those she calls the "sexually nonnormative racialized subject". Perreau explains that "deconstruction of norms cannot be dissociated from their reproduction". Jason Ritchie has also critiqued some of the ways homonationalism has been used, especially as a totalizing theory.

Homonationalism and immigration
A study of Populist Radical Right (PRR) parties in Western Europe, which hold anti-immigration stances, found that even with circulation of homonationalist ideas, queer voters and anti-immigrant, voters claiming to be allies did not vote in line with these parties. These voters favored the mainstream VVD, which was more moderate on migration. Voting in alignment with homonationalist ideals has been observed in  Austria, Norway, Sweden, and Switzerland. The study did not find homonationalist rhetoric in conservative Central and Eastern European PRR parties, in large part due to more mainstream homophobic attitudes.

Homonationalism and terrorism 

In Terrorist Assemblages, Puar writes that "sexual deviance is linked to the process of discerning, othering, and quarantining terrorist bodies, but these racially and sexually perverse figures also labor in the service of disciplining and normalizing subjects worthy of rehabilitation away from these bodies, in other words, signaling and enforcing the mandatory terms of patriotism". Puar claims that the binary reinforced by the othering involved in the War on Terror together with the othering of LGBT bodies has pushed some queer bodies to a "U.S. national citizenship within a spatial-temporal domain" in which she refers to as homonationalism, "short for 'homonormative nationalism.'"

Abu Ghraib was an U.S. military prison in Iraq which was closed following citations of human rights violations committed against the detained. Pictures of some of the violations were sent to CBS news, creating a nationwide scandal in 2004. The photos taken depict sexual abuse, rape, and torture of the detainees. Much of the sexual abuse taking place simulated homosexual acts in a "culturally specific [...] matrix of torture". The inclusion of homosexuality into an American national identity, homonationalism, was specifically employed in Abu Ghraib to torture and sexually and racially other the detainees. According to Puar, during this scandal, queer liberal news medias continued to other Muslim sexuality and identity.

Gaetano Venezia III argues homonationalist narratives were demonstrated in response to the Pulse nightclub shooting in Orlando, Florida in 2016 which was the deadliest mass shooting in American history until the Las Vegas shooting the following year. Venezia argues this disregards historical shootings with more victims, "'...including race riots and labor disputes in the early 1900s and massacres perpetrated by the U.S. Army or settlers in the American West.' Thus, describing the Pulse shooting as the worst mass shooting obscures state violence, protects the image of the state, and minimizes or erases the oppression of indigenous people and racial minorities." Venezia argues that the responses to the Pulse shooting strengthen and protect not only the image of the state but its officials. "Police and politicians often get good press by expressing their sympathy and solidarity with the LGBTQ+ community, even as they remain unapologetic and unresponsive in regards to oppressive policies and actions, like the Stonewall riots, abuse of trans folk, and restrictions on LGBTQ+ rights and protections."

Homonationalism and Israel 
In a 2011 article, Sarah Schulman argues that the Israeli government, as part of a marketing campaign to depict Israel as "relevant and modern", "harness[ed] the gay community to reposition its global image." Schulman writes that anti-occupation LGBT activists have labeled these strategies as pinkwashing: "a deliberate strategy to conceal the continuing violations of Palestinians' human rights behind an image of modernity signified by Israeli gay life."

Also writing in 2011, Maya Mikdashi states, "Today, the promise of 'gay rights' for Palestinian[s] goes something like this: The United States will protect your right to not be detained because [you are] gay, but will not protect you from being detained because you are Palestinian." Mikdashi argues that pinkwashing is not about the toleration of queer bodies and identities, but is instead a political strategy within a discourse of Islamophobia and Arabophobia, and it is part of a larger project to anchor all politics within the axis of identity, and identitarian (and identifiable) groups. Thus critics of pinkwashing who assume an international queer camaraderie repeat a central tenet of homonationalism: homosexuals should be in solidarity with and empathize with each other because they are homosexual.Pinkwashing tactics are described as the whitewashing of racial and religious oppression while claiming to support and enact modern gay rights solely for the representative image of modernity and liberalism. Though Puar describes pinkwashing mostly within the context of Israel, other Western societies including the United States and Canada enact pinkwashing tactics to promote tourism, keep healthy trade and communication lines with other liberal governments, and feign the idea liberalism and democracy.

Homonationalism and Ukraine 
During the 2022 Russian invasion of Ukraine, members of the LGBT community in Ukraine who support their government's war effort feared setbacks in the progress made since Euromaidan. Political scientist Emil Edenborg invoked the concept of homonationalism in Ukraine and the West as a counterpart to a Russian nationalism centered on traditional values, writing that "Russia's geopoliticization of gender is mirrored by homonationalist and femonationalist discourses in the West, when gay rights and gender equality are portrayed as evidence of 'our' national superiority vis-à-vis backward Others, whether Muslim immigrants or homophobic Russians."

See also

References

Further reading 
 
 
 
 

Political movements
LGBT culture
LGBT history
LGBT rights movement
Nationalism and gender
LGBT studies
LGBT and society
LGBT conservatism
2007 neologisms